El Salvador competed at the 2019 Parapan American Games held from August 23 to September 1, 2019 in Lima, Peru. Athletes representing El Salvador won one gold medal in total and the country finished in 15th place in the medal table.

Medalists

Athletics 

El Salvador competed in athletics.

Boccia 

El Salvador competed in boccia.

Powerlifting 

Herbert Aceituno won the gold medal in the men's 65kg event. He also won the Best Male Athlete of Lima 2019 award.

Swimming 

El Salvador competed in swimming.

Table tennis 

El Salvador competed in table tennis.

Wheelchair tennis 

El Salvador competed in wheelchair tennis.

References 

2019 in Salvadoran sport
Nations at the 2019 Parapan American Games